George W. Della Jr. is an American politician from Maryland and a member of the Democratic Party. He is previously served in the Maryland State Senate, representing District 46 in Baltimore City from 1983 to 2011.

Background
Della was born in Baltimore, Maryland, the son of George W. Della, the President of the Maryland Senate.  He attended the University of Baltimore and the University of Baltimore School of Law. He works as an attorney.

Political career
Della was first elected to the Baltimore City Council. In 1982, he won his seat in the Maryland Senate. He sat on the Finance Committee and the Executive Nominations Committee.

In January 2009, he introduced a bill (SB 233) intended to ban "Beer Pong", and would have "outlawed any games that award drinks as prizes in city taverns". Della withdrew the bill eve of its first committee hearing, stating ""We're getting inundated with so many e-mails that I don't have the time to fool with it... ...I just hope that if people continue doing it, they do it in a way that there's not excessive drinking and disrespect for the surrounding neighborhoods."

Della was defeated for reelection in the 2010 Democratic primary by Bill Ferguson.

See also
  Maryland State Senate
 Baltimore City Council
 George W. Della

References

External sources
 Maryland Manual Online:  George W. Della Jr.
 General Assembly of Maryland:  George W. Della Jr.
 Open States:  George W. Della Jr.
 Baltimore Sun:  articles on George W. Della Jr.

Politicians from Baltimore
Democratic Party Maryland state senators
University of Baltimore alumni
University of Baltimore School of Law alumni
Living people
1943 births
Lawyers from Baltimore
21st-century American politicians